Safroko Limba is a chiefdom of Bombali District in the Northern Province of Sierra Leone. The principal town lies at Binkolo.

As of 2015, the chiefdom has a population of 31,256.

References

Chiefdoms of Sierra Leone
Northern Province, Sierra Leone